A list of films produced by the Tollywood (Bengali language film industry) based in Kolkata in the year 1981.

A-Z of films

References

External links
 Tollywood films of 1981 at the Internet Movie Database

1981
Bengali
Films, Bengali